Marias barn is a novel series by Cecil Bødker. about Mary and Jesus. A Swedish TV series became the 1987 SVT Christmas calendar.

Books
Marias barn: drengen (1983)
Marias barn: manden (1984)

References

Bible in popular culture
Book series introduced in 1983